Shaadi No. 1 (Translation: Marriage No. 1) is an Indian comedy film released in November 2005. The film, directed by David Dhawan, stars Sanjay Dutt, Fardeen Khan, Zayed Khan, Sharman Joshi, Esha Deol, Ayesha Takia, Soha Ali Khan, Aarti Chabria, Riya Sen, Sophie Choudry, Satish Shah and Rajpal Yadav. The film was produced by Vashu Bhagnani.The film is a remake of 2001 Kannada movie Kothigalu Saar Kothigalu by Rajendra Singh Babu.

Synopsis 
Raj Mittal, Veer Saxena and Aryan Kapoor are unhappy with their respective marriages even though they love their spouses. Their wives Bhavana (Ayesha Takia), Diya and Sonia are busy with their everyday lives, and their husbands feel ignored by them. Bhavana constantly uses religion as an excuse to not be intimate with her husband, Diya aspires to be an actress for Mr.Y, and Sonia is a lawyer who is obsessed with doing cases with her partner H.S Gulati. the three men try to commit suicide as Veer tries to hang himself on a tree but falls, Aryan drinks expired rat poison and Raj wishes he was run over by a train but their suicide plan does not work until they also meet Kothari who is also trying to commit suicide because he had three companies that have broken down. The three men get a job as Kothari hires them to work for him. Soon the three men come across Kothari's daughters: Madhuri, Rekha and Dimple. It is not long before they are tempted by them. Unfortunately for them, Lucky Bhai is out to make their life hell and expose them to their unassuming wives. The three men sign a contract as the three beauties have been deceived and that their wives are disappointed at them. Once again the three friends commit suicide by standing on top of a ladder but are left hanging when Kothari tries to cut the ladder with a chainsaw. their wives come but are left hanging to as Lucky Bhai saves them but Raj falls into a lump of dust and junk, Aryan falls through wires and electricity and Kothari and Veer fall at the same time but Veer falls into a dog van with a broken arm along with Kothari who falls onto a cement packet. Injured, Veer, Raj, and Aryan apologize to Lucky Bhai as he feels awkward about saving people but has trust in them.

Cast 
 Sanjay Dutt as Lakhwinder "Lucky" Singh Lakha
 Esha Deol as Diya Saxena (Veer's wife)
 Fardeen Khan as Raj Mittal
 Sharman Joshi as Aryan Kapoor
 Ayesha Takia as Bhavna Mittal (Raj's wife)
 Zayed Khan as Veer Saxena
 Soha Ali Khan as Advocate Sonia Kapoor (Aryan's wife)
 Aarti Chhabria as Rekha Kothari (Raj's girlfriend)
 Riya Sen as Madhuri Kothari (Aryan's girlfriend)
 Ali Asgar as H.S Gulati
 Sophie Choudry as Dimple Kothari (Veer's girlfriend)
 Satish Shah as Kothari
 Rajpal Yadav as Mr. Y
 Suresh Menon as Panditji
 Javed Khan as Marriage Registrar
 David Dhawan as himself (opening credits sequence)

Music

Reception 
Taran Adarsh of IndiaFM gave the film 2 out of 5, writing ″SHAADI NO. 1 has a huge star cast, but only a handful of names register an impact. Fardeen, Zayed and Sharman are efficient and what comes as a [pleasant] surprise is that both Fardeen and Zayed have handled the light moments with ease. As far as the leading ladies are concerned, Ayesha Takia and Esha Deol can be singled out. Sanjay Dutt's role might appeal to the masses mainly. Satish Shah is proficient.″  Kaveree Bamzai of India Today wrote ″In a film that seems to comprise the B-list of Bollywood and a strangely enlarged Sanjay Dutt, it is not surprising that the humour falls flat.″

References

External links 
 

2005 films
2000s Hindi-language films
Films directed by David Dhawan
Films scored by Anu Malik
Hindi remakes of Kannada films
Films about Indian weddings
UTV Motion Pictures films